Dina Ayman (born January 9, 1994) is an Egyptian-American computer engineer and advocate for diversity and inclusion in engineering.

Education and career 
Ayman has a bachelor's (2017) and master's (2018) degree from New Jersey Institute of Technology. Following this she worked at Intel and for the city of Austin, Texas. As of 2022, she is a software engineering program manager at Microsoft, the first Egpytian woman to hold this level of position, and is an adjunct professor at New Jersey Institute of Technology. Ayman works to encourage and empower women in the engineering, and is associated with the Haya Karima project to reduce poverty and provide jobs in villages in Egypt.

In 2022 she became the first women with a hijab to compete for Miss Universe, and was named to Forbes' 30 under 30 list.

References

External links 
 

1994 births
Living people
Microsoft employees
New Jersey Institute of Technology alumni
Computer engineers
American people of Egyptian descent
Engineers from New Jersey
Intel people
American computer specialists
Beauty pageant contestants from New Jersey